Thomas James Fitzgerald (born August 28, 1968) is an American former professional ice hockey player who played 17 seasons in the National Hockey League and the American Hockey League. He currently serves as the general manager and executive Vice President of the New Jersey Devils. He won the Stanley Cup in 2009 as a director of player development with the Pittsburgh Penguins.

Playing career
Fitzgerald played his high school hockey at Austin Preparatory School in Reading, Massachusetts, he then went on to play college hockey for Providence College and was selected by the New York Islanders of the NHL in the 1986 NHL Entry Draft (1st round, 17th overall). He turned pro in 1988 with the Islanders' American Hockey League affiliate Springfield Indians, and in 1990 was one of the key players who led Indians to the Calder Cup championship.

He played parts of five seasons for the Islanders and became the first player in NHL playoff history to score two shorthanded goals on the same minor penalty, against the Pittsburgh Penguins on May 2, 1993, which also equaled the NHL record for shorthanded goals by a player in one game. He was selected as one of the original Florida Panthers in the 1993 NHL Expansion Draft. Although he has been cast as a defensive forward in the NHL, he had his best scoring years in Miami and was one of the leaders in Florida's 1996 Stanley Cup run. In those 1995–96 playoffs, Fitzgerald scored the decisive goal in Game 7 of the Eastern Conference Finals against the Pittsburgh Penguins. It was a 58-foot slapshot that found its way past Penguins goaltender Tom Barrasso.

He was briefly traded to the Colorado Avalanche in 1998 before being drafted in another expansion draft, this time by the Nashville Predators, who sought out his veteran leadership.  Fitzgerald was named Nashville's first captain, serving in the capacity for four seasons. He subsequently played for the Chicago Blackhawks and the Toronto Maple Leafs. He had signed with the Maple Leafs to a two-year contract on July 18, 2002. While with Toronto, Fitzgerald and his Maple Leafs teammate Gary Roberts both played in the 1,000th game of their careers on January 13, 2004.

In the summer of 2004, Fitzgerald signed as a free agent with the Boston Bruins. In July 2006, the Boston Bruins chose not to renew his contract. He announced his retirement after 17 NHL seasons on September 12, 2006.

Executive career
In July 2007, Fitzgerald left NESN when he was named Director of Player Development for the Pittsburgh Penguins. In October, he was then named as an assistant coach for the United States national team for Deutschland Cup, helping push them to second place. On July 3, 2009, Fitzgerald was then promoted within the Penguins organization to assistant general manager. On July 24, 2015, Fitzgerald was named assistant general manager for the New Jersey Devils. On January 12, 2020, Fitzgerald was named interim general manager of the Devils' after Ray Shero was fired. On July 9, 2020, Fitzgerald was named Executive Vice President and full time General Manager of the Devils.

Personal life
Tom and his wife Kerry have four sons; Ryan, Casey, Jack and Brendan. Fitzgerald did a stint as an analyst for the Outdoor Life Network during the 2006 Stanley Cup playoffs, and was one of NESN's studio analysts during postgame coverage of Boston Bruins' matches. His son Ryan was drafted in the fourth round (120th overall) in the 2013 NHL Entry Draft by the Boston Bruins, and currently plays for the Lehigh Valley Phantoms, the Philadelphia Flyers's AHL affiliate. Casey, who was drafted in the third round (86th overall) of the 2016 NHL Entry Draft by the Buffalo Sabres, currently plays for the Rochester Americans, the Sabres' AHL affiliate. Both Ryan and Casey attended Boston College, skating on the same roster from 2015–2017.

Fitzgerald grew up with his cousin, fellow NHL player Keith Tkachuk. He is also cousins with Tkachuk's sons Matthew of the Florida Panthers and Brady of the Ottawa Senators, as well as Kevin Hayes of the Philadelphia Flyers and the late Jimmy Hayes, who most recently played for the Wilkes-Barre/Scranton Penguins.

Career statistics

Regular season and playoffs

International

See also
List of NHL players with 1,000 games played

References

External links

1968 births
Living people
American men's ice hockey right wingers
Boston Bruins players
Boston Bruins announcers
Capital District Islanders players
Chicago Blackhawks players
Colorado Avalanche players
Florida Panthers players
Ice hockey people from Massachusetts
Nashville Predators players
National Hockey League first-round draft picks
National Hockey League general managers
New Jersey Devils executives
New York Islanders draft picks
New York Islanders players
People from Billerica, Massachusetts
Pittsburgh Penguins coaches
Pittsburgh Penguins executives
Springfield Indians players
Sportspeople from Middlesex County, Massachusetts
Stanley Cup champions
Toronto Maple Leafs players
Ice hockey players from Massachusetts
American expatriate ice hockey players in Canada